Maywood Academy High School (MAHS) is an alternative high school of the Los Angeles Unified School District, located in Maywood, CA.

All residents are zoned to Bell High School in Bell and Huntington Park High School in Huntington Park may apply to Maywood Academy High School; Maywood Academy, which opened in 2005 and moved into its permanent campus in 2006, does not have its own attendance boundary because it lacks American football, track and field, and tennis facilities. Several municipalities are in the service zone of MAHS.

Areas within the service zone include the City of Maywood, the City of Bell, the City of Cudahy, the City of Huntington Park, portions of Vernon, and most of the Walnut Park census-designated place.

Academies 
The high school previously offered four Small Learning Communities (SLCs) for  approximately 200 students, specializing in: Architecture/Design, Performing Arts, Radio Production, and Information/ Technology.  In 2010, as part of the Public School Choice Process, the students, staff and parents elected to move from four SLCs to three:  School of Liberal Arts (SoLA), School of Science, and School of Business and Technology.  The course offerings from the previous SLCs will be liquidated into the three improved SLCs.  The concept of Small Learning Communities is to create opportunities for individualized learning experiences in collaboration between teachers, students and parents.

Athletics 

The curriculum of the high school is covered an athletic program consisting of:
Baseball
Basketball
Cross Country
Soccer
Softball
Swimming
Water Polo
Volleyball

The school also has a music program which consists of:
Beginning Band
Advanced Band
Keyboard

References

External links

Official Website
School Demographics
LAUSD School Homepage

The school's use of Green Technology
"Southeast Area New Learning Center Area Schools." - Maywood Academy attendance boundary

Los Angeles Unified School District schools
Maywood, California
Alternative schools in California
High schools in Los Angeles County, California
Public high schools in California
2006 establishments in California